Alena Baeva (born 1985) (Russian: Алёна Михайловна Баева) is a Luxembourgisch violinist, winner of the First Prize and nine Special Prizes at the XII International Henryk Wieniawski Violin Competition in 2001, and the First Prize at the International T. Wronski solo violin competition in Warsaw for violinists under 30 in 2000. In 2005, she was a finalist and laureate at the Queen Elisabeth Competition.

On June 2, 2007, Baeva was declared 1st prize winner of the 3rd Sendai International Music Competition, in the violin section.

External links
alena-baeva.com
Alena Baeva on Facebook
Tchaikovsky: Violin Concerto op.35 & Romeo and Juliet Fantasy Overture (YouTube): performed by Alena Baeva and the Düsseldorfer Symphoniker Orchestra conducted by Alexandre Bloch

Russian classical violinists
1985 births
Living people
Henryk Wieniawski Violin Competition prize-winners
21st-century classical violinists